The Port of Garston, also known as Garston Docks is an enclosed tidal dock system on the River Mersey at Garston, approx 6 miles from Liverpool City centre Liverpool, England. It is operated by Associated British Ports

History
Garston Dock was originally set up by the St. Helens and Runcorn Gap Railway Company in June 1853.  It contains Old Dock, North Dock and Stalbridge Dock.

By 1936 the 3 docks had  of water,  of sidings,  of storage and dealt with about two million tons of goods a year.

Present day

The present site covers 65 acres. Approximately 425k of imported freight is handled per annum. No cargo is exported from Garston. The port handles fertiliser, cement, stone, sea dredged aggregate
and agribulks. Wheat, steel and salt imports along with scrap exports have relocated to other port facilities both locally and elsewhere within UK in recent years. Between 2012 and 2017, ABP invested several million pounds in essential investment, replacing lock gates, additional storage facilities and the purchase of new crane capacity. Owing to decline of trade at port the crane purchased has been transferred within ABP to Newport June 2022. Land ABP deemed non essential to port operations has been sold for a housing development which now borders a section of the port estate.

References

External links

https://web.archive.org/web/20051119104917/http://www.mersey-gateway.org/server.php?show=ConNarrative.37&chapterId=189
MultiMap photo

Liverpool
Ports and harbours of the Irish Sea

Mersey docks